Joseph Muscat  (born 22 January 1974) is a Maltese politician who served as the 13th prime minister of Malta from 2013 to 2020 and leader of the Labour Party from 2008 to 2020.

Muscat was re-elected as prime minister in the elections of 3 June 2017 (55.04% after 54.83% in 2013). Previously he was a member of the European Parliament (MEP) from 2004 to 2008. He was the leader of the opposition from October 2008 to March 2013. Muscat identifies as a progressive and liberal politician, with pro-business leanings, and has been associated with both economically liberal and socially liberal policies.

Muscat succeeded Alfred Sant as party leader in 2008. He rebranded the Labour Party, which embraced an increasingly socially liberal and centrist position. The 2013 general election saw Muscat becoming Prime Minister in March 2013. His premiership was marked for pulling together a national consensus for economic growth, based on a restructured Maltese economy. His administration led to large-scale changes to welfare and civil liberties, including the legalisation of same-sex marriage in July 2017. Muscat presided over the rise of the Labour Party and its dominance in Maltese politics, and the relative decline of the Nationalist Party. He has been criticised by figures on both the left and right, and has been accused of political opportunism, broken promises on meritocracy and the environment, as well as corruption allegations. On 1 December 2019, under pressure from the 2019 street protests calling for his resignation in relation to the assassination of journalist Daphne Caruana Galizia, Muscat announced his resignation, and stepped down on 13 January 2020.

Early life and career

Family 

Muscat was born on 22 January 1974, in Pietà, Malta, to a Burmarrad family. He is an only child. With his father a fireworks importer, Muscat constantly referred to his family roots when describing his aversion to bureaucracy that hinders business. Muscat is married to Michelle Muscat (née Tanti) and they are the parents of twins, Etoile Ella and Soleil Sophie.

Education 
Muscat received his formal education at the Government Primary School in St. Paul's Bay, Stella Maris and St. Aloysius' College. Educated at St. Aloysius' in the 1980s, Muscat experienced the closure of Church schools by the Labour government of the day. This experience was reflected in the Labour party's 2013 manifesto with a pledge to continue financially supporting Church schools.

He graduated Bachelor of Commerce in Management and Public Policy (University of Malta, 1995), Bachelor of Arts with Honours in Public Policy (University of Malta, 1996), and Master of Arts in European Studies (University of Malta, 1997). In 2007, he attained a Doctorate of Philosophy in Management Research from the University of Bristol with a thesis on Fordism, multinationals and SMEs in Malta, written during Muscat's term as MEP. 
The works of Mario Vella are quoted in Muscat's thesis and, according to Daphne Caruana Galizia, Vella could have himself authored certain parts of it.

Politics 

Muscat was as a member of the youth section of the Labour Party, the Labour Youth Forum (Forum Żgħażagħ Laburisti) where he served as financial secretary (1994–97) and acting chairperson (1997). 
During the Labour government of 1996–98 he was a member of the National Commission for Fiscal Morality (1997–98) and was considered a protégé of Mario Vella. He later served as education secretary in the central administration of the party (2001–2003) and chairman of its annual general conference (November 2003).

During his university years, from 1992 till 1997, Muscat worked as a journalist with the Labour Party's media arm, and founded the Party's now defunct news portal maltastar.com. He also worked as a journalist with the party's radio station, Super One Radio. He later took on a similar role at the Labour Party's Super One Television, chaired by Alfred Mifsud, becoming assistant head of news in 1996. Muscat wrote a regular column in L-Orizzont, a Maltese-language newspaper published by the General Workers' Union, as well as its sister Sunday weekly It-Torċa; he was a regular contributor to the independent newspaper The Times of Malta.

Upon graduation, in 1997 Muscat was employed as investment adviser by the Malta External Trade Corporation (METCO) and soon after joined as market intelligence manager the newly established Institute for the Promotion of Small Enterprise (IPSE) under the Malta Development Corporation (MDC) headed by Mario Vella; as he himself noted in his PhD thesis, in this post Muscat was effectively considered a political appointee and a person of trust of the ruling party. This situation made it harder for him to retain the confidence of the management after the return in power of the Nationalist Party in 1998 and the departure of Mario Vella from the MDC. He stayed in the position till 2001.

After staunchly campaigning against Malta's membership in the European Union at the 2003 referendum, the Labour Party lost its second general election in a row. In 2003, Muscat was nominated to a working group led by George Vella and Evarist Bartolo on the Labour Party's policies on the European Union. This working group produced the document Il-Partit Laburista u l-Unjoni Ewropea: Għall-Ġid tal-Maltin u l-Għawdxin ('Labour Party and the European Union: For the benefit of the Maltese and the Gozitans') which was adopted by the Labour Party Extraordinary General Conference in November of that year. The working group was instrumental in changing the Labour Party's eurosceptic policies, leading it to embrace a pro-EU stance. At this General Conference, Muscat was approved as a candidate for member of the European Parliament.

Member of the European Parliament (2004–2008) 
Despite having previously expressed opposition to Malta's entry into the European Union, Muscat was elected to the European Parliament in the 2004 European Parliament election. He was the Labour Party (formerly the Malta Labour Party) candidate who received the most first-preference votes. Sitting as a Member of the European Parliament, with the Party of European Socialists, he held the post of Vice-President of the Parliament's Committee on Economic and Monetary Affairs and substitute member of the committee on the Internal Market and Consumer Protection. He was a member of a number of delegations for relations with Belarus and with the countries of south-east Europe. He was also a member of the EU-Armenia, EU-Azerbaijan and EU-Georgia Parliamentary Cooperation Committees. As an MEP he supported a reduction in the tax for satellite television, the right for customers to watch sport events for free, and a number of issues related to environmental protection in Malta. He formed part of a team responsible for a report on the roaming mobile phone bills and sale of banks.

In 2006, he was the recipient of the Outstanding Young Person of the Year. Muscat resigned his seat in the European Parliament in 2008 to take up a seat in the Maltese Parliament, and the role of Leader of the Opposition. Four months previously, he had been elected Leader of the Labour Party. Before his resignation, the European Parliament adopted his report proposing new regulations for the EU's financial services sector.

Leader of Labour Party 

On 24 March 2008 Muscat announced his candidacy for the post of Party Leader, to replace Alfred Sant, who had resigned after a third consecutive defeat for the Party in the March 2008 general election and a heavy defeat in the EU referendum in March 2003.

Although at the time Muscat was not a member of the Maltese House of Representatives, he was elected as the new party leader on 6 June 2008. Muscat was just three votes short of winning the contest outright, obtaining 435 of the 874 valid votes cast, three fewer than the 438 needed (50 per cent plus one). He garnered 49.8 per cent of valid votes cast while the combined number of votes of the other contestants was 50.2 per cent. In order to take up the post of Leader of the Opposition, Muscat was co-opted in the Maltese Parliament on 1 October 2008 to fill the seat vacated by Joseph Cuschieri for the purpose. The latter eventually took up the sixth seat allocated to Malta in the European Parliament once the Treaty of Lisbon was brought into effect in 2011. On taking up the Leadership post, Muscat introduced a number of changes to the Party, notably the change of official name and party emblem. In the 2009 Maltese European Parliament Elections, the first with Muscat as Party Leader, Labour candidates obtained 55% of first-preferences against the 40% obtained by candidates of the Nationalist Party.

First term as Prime Minister 

Muscat contested Malta's general elections for the first time in March 2013 and was elected on District 2 on the first count, with 13,968 votes and on District 4 again on the first count with 12,202 votes and 53% of the vote. On 11 March 2013 he was sworn in as Prime Minister of Malta. Following his election victory, Muscat was congratulated in a statement by the President of the European Commission, José Manuel Barroso, on behalf of the European Commission.

On 7 April 2014, Muscat suffered from temporary blindness caused by UV radiation, probably related to burns to his cornea. Like 60 other people with similar symptoms, he had participated at a political rally the day before.

In 2014, Muscat's government introduced the Malta Individual Investor Programme, for which it contracted Henley & Partners. Through such programmes, applicants acquire Maltese citizenship against investing a minimum of 1 million EUR in the country. The citizenship-by-investment programme soon became a boon to Malta's economy, generating up to €163.5 million in revenues in 2016, which the government used to finance deficit spending. Muscat repeatedly defended such passport sale scheme, also presenting and promoting it personally at global Henley & Partners events in Dubai and elsewhere.
 Malta became an attractive location for foreign direct investment in financial services, online gaming, information technology, maritime and aviation hubs and high value-added manufacturing clusters. His administration led to large-scale changes to welfare with the introduction of social benefit tapering policies, increases in minimum wages, and introduced private sector involvement in healthcare.

After three years Muscat claimed that he had presided over Malta's economic turnaround, and – amongst others – was instrumental for the introduction and strengthening of civil liberties, improvements in the health and energy sector, and the elimination of out-of-stock medicines, the reduction in energy tariffs, the introduction of free-childcare centres, higher social benefits to parents and the youth employment guarantee. 
Upon being elected to office, the Muscat administration found a worsening public deficit, a slowdown in the economy, the country's main utility provider on the verge of bankruptcy and a slowing economy in Gozo. The directional change resulted in economic growth of over 6%, the elimination of the public deficit and a decrease in the public debt burden. Poverty was reduced and pensions were increased for the first time in 25 years. Muscat insisted that these results were delivered by his government as a team. Among others, the Muscat administration's family friendly measures led to a 9% increase in female participation in the labour market, substantial savings to first-time home buyers, the value-added tax car registration refund, in-work benefits to low-income couples and single parents, stipends given to 900 students who repeated a year and the introduction of civil unions. Muscat admitted that his first administration had its challenges, namely the environment and good governance.

Panama Papers 

In 2016, two of Muscat's close collaborators were implicated in the Panama Papers, holding two companies in that jurisdiction. These were Konrad Mizzi, a minister, and Keith Schembri, the Prime Minister's chief of staff. In 2017 journalist and blogger Daphne Caruana Galizia alleged that Muscat's wife held a third company in Panama named Egrant. Opposition Leader Simon Busuttil made his own allegations of significant money transfers into Egrant. Muscat and his wife Michelle denied the claims and Muscat requested an independent magisterial inquiry, calling the allegations the 'biggest political lie in Malta's political history'. Muscat insisted that truth was on his side, and that he wanted to protect Malta from uncertainty, and called a general election. Corruption became the battlecry for the Nationalist Party in the general election campaign. Holding a snap election in the last months of Malta's rotating presidency of the EU Council was looked at with scepticism in Brussels.

The magisterial inquiry led by Magistrate Aaron Bugeja interviewed 477 witnesses. International forensic experts sifted through thousands of documents and digital records from multiple sources. The inquiry required the collaboration of five nations (including Panama and Germany) and spanned over 15 months. The results of the inquiry were made public on 22 July 2018 (though the final report of the inquiry was never released for public scrutiny). The inquiry found falsified signatures, differing testimonies and no proof that the Prime Minister, his wife, or their family had a connection with the company. The inquiry found no evidence linking the Prime Minister and his wife to the Panama company.
Muscat defined the Egrant allegations as an "undisputed and elaborate" attempt at a political frame up.

General election 2017 
The Labour Party ran a campaign focused on the administration's successes and achievements over the previous four years. Muscat stressed the record economic growth and employment levels, and the turnaround in the country's finances from deficit to surplus. The Labour campaign highlighted the fulfilled pledges, dealing with tax reductions, social benefits and childcare, as well as higher student stipends. Labour's fight on poverty and increase in pensions also featured prominently. Muscat's pledges for the next five years were aimed at the better distribution of the country's wealth, giving workers back public holidays that fall during a weekend, an ambitious seven-year plan to resurface all of Malta's roads and a tax bonus for every worker earning up to 60,000 euro.

The Labour Party, with Muscat at its helm, won the 2017 General Election and was returned to power with a wider majority.

Second term as Prime Minister 
Muscat's first commitment upon being elected was the introduction of a gay marriage law before Parliament's summer recess. Same-sex marriage was legalised by mid-July 2017, after a vote which tested the Nationalist Party's conservative MPs. 

In July, Muscat closed Malta's presidency of the EU Council, describing the country's achievements and the sense of positivity the EU Presidency brought to Malta. The Presidency itself got mixed reviews in Brussels.

2019 political crisis and resignation 

In October 2017, investigative journalist Daphne Caruana Galizia died in a car bomb attack. Muscat promised to "leave no stone unturned" in the subsequent investigation. The opposition blamed Muscat for what they deemed a "political murder" and for the collapse of the rule of law in the country. In the following two years, Muscat spoke very sparingly of the Caruana Galizia case and of the periodic protests that took place in Valletta. Government employees were tasked with clearing a makeshift memorial to Caruana Galizia at the Great Siege Monument in Valletta on a regular basis.

Muscat faced accusations of failing to take action against two close aides: Keith Schembri, his chief of staff, and Konrad Mizzi, tourism and formerly energy minister, whose business and underworld links had been subject to judiciary and administrative investigations.

Around the 2019 European elections, Muscat was touted for an EU job, possibly as successor to Donald Tusk as head of the European Council. His bid failed. While he had been a frontrunner to succeed Tusk back in 2017, in 2019 his image was tainted by the Caruana Galizia murder and the multiple reports of European institutions warning about the erosion of the rule of law in Malta.

In late November 2019, Muscat's premiership was rocked by the arrest of prominent businessman Yorgen Fenech and the implication of Muscat's chief of staff Keith Schembri. On 25 November 2019, after protestors had called for him to resign, Muscat autonomously decided to grant presidential pardon to Melvin Theuma, considered the middleman between the executors of Caruana Galizia's murder, and the masterminds. On 29 November, after a six-hours cabinet meeting, Muscat denied the same presidential pardon to Yorgen Fenech. The same day Muscat informed the President of Malta George Vella that he would soon be resigning his duties as Prime Minister.

On 1 December he announced that he would step down from his position as Prime Minister, after a PL leadership contest. Both Malta's main newspapers, The Times of Malta and Malta Today, as well as international media such as The Guardian called on Muscat to make his resignation immediate. The European Parliament also called for Muscat to immediately quit over the Caruana Galizia murder. National protests were held calling for his immediate resignation, rather than stepping down in January 2020. The Organised Crime and Corruption Reporting Project named Muscat "Man of the Year in Organized Crime and Corruption" for 2019 for the increases in criminality and lack of prosecutions during his term.

In December 2019 Muscat had a strictly private meeting with Pope Francis. While in Rome, he did not meet with Italian Prime Minister Giuseppe Conte.

Muscat gave his final speech as Prime Minister on 10 January 2020. Following Robert Abela's victory over Chris Fearne in the Labour Party internal competition, Muscat resigned as Prime Minister.

Following activities 
In late 2019 / early 2020, Muscat went on a number of oversea trips, including a New Year's Day trip to London and a 70-hour trip to Dubai with his family on 27–30 December, out of which 15 hours were spent in transit, to attend the Ritossa Family office Investment Summit. The tickets were purchased in Jordan. Despite Muscat's initial statement that he had paid for the trip out of his own pocket, Malta's Standards Commissioner George Hyzler confirmed that the first-class flights (for a total of €21,000) were paid by a third party, which he decided not to name, upon Muscat's request, as the visit was of a private nature.

In September 2020, financial crime blogger Kenneth Rijock alleged that Muscat aimed to move to Dubai and take up a post as CEO of a Maltese-owned Dubai catering company which had just been awarded a lucrative public tender in Malta. Rijock claimed Muscat could be among the targets of an FBI special money laundering investigation focusing on Malta, and as there is no extradition treaty between the United Arab Emirates and the United States. Muscat denied plans to move to Dubai.

In August 2020, Muscat was interrogated by police on the case of the murder of Daphne Caruana Galizia, following remarks by suspect Yorgen Fenech. Muscat was not under investigation. Muscat's former chief of staff Keith Schembri was arrested in September 2020 for money-laundering and corruption linked to the sale of Maltese citizenship.

In October 2020, Muscat resigned as Member of the Maltese Parliament with a 90-second speech.

In December 2020, Joseph Muscat testified for the public inquiry on Caruana Galizia's murder; he confirmed close contacts and "friendship" with Yorgen Fenech, while denying having any indication on the murder plot. In July 2021 the inquiry conclusions affirmed that Muscat's cabinet was "collectively responsible" for Caruana Galizia's death, having failed to grant her protection and having contributed in spreading a "culture of impunity" that ultimately facilitated the assassination. Muscat has accepted the results of the inquiry, despite expressing "serious reservations" on its conclusions.

Wealth 
Since 2014, Muscat has declared an unchanging bank balance of €75,000. Since 2015, he has stopped declaring his actual salary, simply stating "salary prime minister" on his yearly asset declaration, which shows lower income than a number of cabinet ministers. In 2018, according to his spokesperson, his salary amounted to €55,978 plus €6,769 in allowances.

Honours

National honours 
 : Companion of Honour of the National Order of Merit (2013) by right as a Prime Minister of Malta

Foreign honours 
 : Honorary Knight Commander of the Order of St Michael and St George (2015)
 : Grand Cross of the Order of Honour
 : Grand Cross – Special Class – of the Order pro Merito Melitensi
 : Great Cross of Merit – Grand Cross
 : Order of the Prince Yaroslav the Wise – II class
 : Knight Grand Cross of the Order of Merit of the Italian Republic (10 January 2018)

References

External links 

 

|-

|-

|-

1974 births
Alumni of the University of Bristol
University of Malta alumni
Companions of Honour of the National Order of Merit (Malta)
Honorary Knights Commander of the Order of St Michael and St George
Recipients of the Order of Prince Yaroslav the Wise, 2nd class
Labour Party (Malta) MEPs
Leaders of political parties in Malta
Leaders of the Opposition (Malta)
Living people
Maltese Roman Catholics
Members of the House of Representatives of Malta
MEPs for Malta 2004–2009
People from Pietà, Malta
Prime Ministers of Malta
Grand Crosses 1st class of the Order of Merit of the Federal Republic of Germany
Recipients of the Order pro Merito Melitensi
21st-century Maltese politicians